James Otto "Tex" Carleton (August 19, 1906 – January 11, 1977) was a Major League Baseball pitcher from 1932 to 1940 for the St. Louis Cardinals, Chicago Cubs, and Brooklyn Dodgers. Carleton threw a no-hitter on April 30, 1940, against the Reds when he was with the Dodgers. Only a year earlier he had been sold down to the minors and released.  His career marks were 100 wins, 76 losses and a 3.90 earned run average.

As a hitter, Carleton had the exact number of hits as wins (100) in his major league career. He posted a .185 batting average (100-for-540) with 47 runs, 6 home runs, 54 RBI and drawing 35 bases on balls.

See also
 List of Major League Baseball no-hitters

References

External links

1906 births
1977 deaths
St. Louis Cardinals players
Chicago Cubs players
Brooklyn Dodgers players
Major League Baseball pitchers
Texarkana Twins players
Austin Senators players
Houston Buffaloes players
Rochester Red Wings players
Montreal Royals players
TCU Horned Frogs baseball players
Baseball players from Texas
People from Comanche, Texas